HC Krylya Sovetov (Soviet Wings) is a professional ice hockey team based in Moscow, Russia. The team played in the top divisions of Soviet and Russian hockey.

In 2008, the team was expelled from the Soviet Wings Sport Palace and a new team, MHC Krylya Sovetov was created. PHC Krylya Sovetov played at the Minor Arena and Vityaz Ice Palace in Podolsk until 2010, when the team was reunited with MHC Krylya Sovetov and returned to the Soviet Wings Sport Palace. But after 2011, it was not able to continue to operate as a professional hockey club and withdrew from the championship on all levels. In 2016, the team returned to play in the MHL.

History
Krylya Sovetov Moscow (Wings of the Soviets, Soviet Wings) was founded in 1947 by the Krylya Sovetov sports society that represented Soviet aircraft industry.

Controversy
In 2008, the owner of the Soviet Wings Sport Palace, the All-Russia Institute of Light Alloys (VILS) accused Krylya Sovetov of overdue rent payments. This led to the subsequent eviction of the team. The main team left under president Aleksandr Tretiak's lead and took a name PHC Krylya Sovetov, but Krylya's hockey school, junior subsidiary teams, and other infrastructure opted to remain under the effective ownership of VILS.

After playing one season in Vysshaya Liga, the VILS team decided to change its affiliation to the Junior League. While PHC Krylya Sovetov failed to qualify for the VHL, a newly created independent league that was supposed to replace Vysshaya Liga. After the KHL president Alexander Medvedev interfered in the conflict, the situation was settled and both teams reunited to play in the VHL starting with its 2010–11 season. Albeit due to financial hardship the club had to resign from the league in the next season. De facto Krylya ceased to exist as a professional team in 2011.

Honors

Champions
 Soviet Championship League Championship (2): 1957, 1974
 USSR Cup (3): 1951, 1974, 1989
 European Cup (1): 1974
 Spengler Cup (1): 1979
 Ahearne Cup (2): 1961, 1968

Runners-up
 Soviet Championship League Championship (4): 1955, 1956, 1958, 1975
 Soviet Championship League Championship (9): 1950, 1951, 1954, 1959, 1960, 1973, 1978, 1989, 1991
 IHL Championship (1): 1993
 USSR Cup (2): 1952, 1954
 Spengler Cup (1): 1987

Notable alumni
 Alexei Guryshev (1947–1961)
 Alfred Kuchevsky (1949–1961)
 Vladimir Petrov (1965–1967)
 Alexander Sidelnikov (1967–1984)
 Sergei Pryakhin (1979–1989)
 Yuri Khmylev (1980–1991)
 Viktor Gordiuk (1986–1992)
 Alexander Korolyuk (1992–1997)
 Alexei Morozov (1993–1997)
 Alexander Frolov (2000–2002)
 Anton Volchenkov (2001–2002)

References

External links
 Alternate Official Website

1947 establishments in Russia
Ice hockey clubs established in 1947
Ice hockey teams in Russia
Junior Hockey League (Russia) teams
Sports clubs in Moscow